The Hanson Creek Formation is a geologic formation in Nevada. It preserves fossils dating back to the Dapingian-Katian (Ibexian-Richmondian in the regional stratigraphy) stages of the Ordovician period.

See also 

 List of fossiliferous stratigraphic units in Nevada
 Paleontology in Nevada

References

Further reading 
 W. C. Sweet. 2000. Conodonts and Biostratigraphy of Upper Ordovician Strata Along a Shelf to Basin Transect in Central Nevada. Journal of Paleontology 74(6):1148-1160
 G. W. Renz. 1990. Late Ordovician (Caradocian) radiolarians from Nevada. Micropaleontology 36(4):367-377
 R. J. Elias. 1983. Late Ordovician solitary rugose corals of the Stony Mountain Formation, southern Manitoba, and its equivalents. Journal of Paleontology 57(5):924-956
 R. J. Ross, Jr., T. B. Nolan, and A.G. Harris. 1980. The Upper Ordovician and Silurian Hanson Creek Formation of central Nevada. United States Geological Survey Professional Paper (1126-A-J)C1-C22
 R. J. Rose, Jr., T. B. Nolan, and A. G. Harris. 1979. The Upper Ord. and Sil. Hanson Cr. Fm. of central NV. U.S. Geological Survey Professional Paper 1126C
 R. J. Ross, Jr. 1970. Ordovician Brachiopods, Trilobites, and Stratigraphy in Eastern and Central Nevada. United States Geological Survey Professional Paper 639:1-99

Geologic formations of Nevada
Ordovician System of North America
Ordovician geology of Nevada
Dapingian
Darriwilian
Sandbian
Katian
Limestone formations of the United States
Ordovician southern paleotropical deposits